Bawi was a Sasanian military officer from the Ispahbudhan family who was involved in the Anastasian War and the Iberian War between the Sasanian and Byzantine Empire. He is also known as Aspebedes, which is a corruption of the title spahbed.

Biography

According to Procopius, coins of Bawi were minted during the reign of Kavadh I (r. 488-496, 499-531) due to the marriage of the latter with his sister, and, therefore, he became the uncle of the future king Khosrau I (r. 531-579). Apparently he was the father of a person known as Asparapet, whose original name was Shapur, who was the grandfather of Shah Khosrau II (r. 591-628), the son of Shapur's daughter and Hormizd IV (r. 579-590); beyond this relationship, it is known that Shapur was the father of Vistahm and Vinduyih.

According to some sources, Bawi participated in the negotiations that led to the peace of 506 between Anastasius I (r. 491-518) and Kavadh I, which ended the Anastasian War. After the Sasanian defeat at the battle of Dara during the Iberian War, Kavadh organized an invasion of Byzantine territory, in which a large army, commanded by Mihr-Mihroe, Chanaranges and Bawi, who invaded Mesopotamia and besieged the city of Martyropolis, which at that time was being protected by Buzes and Bessas. While commanding a large force, with winter approaching and Byzantine reinforcements coming from Amida and the sudden death of Kavadh, the Sasanians lifted the siege in November or December.

At the beginning of Khosrau I's reign in 531, Bawi, along with other members of the Persian aristocracy became involved in a conspiracy in which they tried to overthrow Khosrau and make Kavadh, the son of Kavadh's second eldest son Djamasp (Zames), the king of the Sasanian Empire. Upon learning of the plot, Khosrau executed all his brothers, their offspring, along with Bawi and the other "Persian notables" who were involved. Khosrau also ordered the execution of Kavadh, who was still a child, and was away from the court, being raised by Adergoudounbades. Khosrau sent orders to kill Kavadh, but Adergoudounbades disobeyed and brought him up in secret, until he was betrayed to the shah in 541 by his own son, Bahram (Varranes). Khosrau had him executed, but Kavadh, or someone claiming to be him, managed to flee to the Byzantine Empire.

Family tree

References

Bibliography 

 
 
 
 
 

531 deaths
6th-century Iranian people
Generals of Kavad I
People of the Roman–Sasanian Wars
Year of birth unknown
House of Ispahbudhan
Spahbeds
People executed by the Sasanian Empire
Iberian War
Anastasian War
Diplomats of the Sasanian Empire